Tyger Evans (born March 13, 2001) is an American soccer player who plays as a defender for Penn State Nittany Lions.

Career 
Evans made one appearance with the Philadelphia Union II when they played in the USL Championship. Ahead of the 2020 NCAA Division I men's soccer season, Evans signed a National Letter of Intent to play college soccer for Pennsylvania State University. Evans made his collegiate debut on February 23, 2021 in a 2–1 victory over Rutgers University. On April 10, 2021, Evans scored his first collegiate goal in a 3–1 victory over Ohio State University.

References

External links
Tyger Evans at US Soccer Development Academy
Tyger Evans at Penn State Athletics

2001 births
Living people
American soccer players
Association football defenders
Philadelphia Union II players
USL Championship players
Soccer players from Pennsylvania
People from Delaware County, Pennsylvania
Penn State Nittany Lions men's soccer players